Seth Sahadev Lal Bansal Government Hospital is a primary health centre in Ajeetpura, India established by Seth Sahadev Lal Bansal. This is the hub of about a dozen of sub-health centres.

It is on the Gadara Road.

References

Hospitals in Rajasthan
Hanumangarh district
Hospitals with year of establishment missing